KTTN may refer to:

 The ICAO code for Trenton-Mercer Airport
 KTTN (AM), a radio station (1600 AM) licensed to Trenton, Missouri, United States
 KTTN-FM, a radio station (92.3 FM) licensed to Trenton, Missouri, United States